"Bada nakna" is a song by Swedish duo Samir & Viktor. The song was released in Sweden as a digital download on 6 February 2016, and was written by Fredrik Kempe, David Kreuger, and Anderz Wrethov. It took part in Melodifestivalen 2016, and qualified to the second chance round (andra chansen) from the first semi-final. In andra chansen, it qualified to the final, where it subsequently placed last.

Charts

Weekly charts

Year-end charts

Certifications

Release history

References

2015 songs
2016 singles
Swedish pop songs
Swedish-language songs
Samir & Viktor songs
Warner Music Group singles
Songs written by Fredrik Kempe
Songs written by David Kreuger
Songs written by Wrethov
Melodifestivalen songs of 2016
Number-one singles in Sweden